Benno Rafael Adam (15 July 1812, Munich - 8 March 1892, Kelheim) was a German animal painter.

Life
He was the eldest son of the painter Albrecht Adam, and distinguished himself especially by his depictions of game animals, hunting dogs and pets in larger compositions (deer and boar hunting, fox baiting, etc.) He was associated with the Chiemsee artists' colony.

In addition to his paintings, he illustrated several textbooks and manuals, including Anleitung zur Rindviehzucht und zur verschiedenartigen Benutzung des Hornviehs (Guide to Beef Cattle Breeding and the Diverse Use of Horned Cattle) by Heinrich Wilhelm von Pabst, J. G. Cotta, Stuttgart (1851).

In the summer of 1834, he married Josepha Quaglio, the eldest daughter of the painter and architect Domenico Quaglio. Their son Emil Adam also became a painter. Benno Adam's brothers were the painters Franz and Eugen Adam.

Selected paintings

Sources

External links
 

1812 births
1892 deaths
Artists from Munich
19th-century German painters
German male painters
Animal artists
19th-century German male artists